Hüntwangen-Wil is a railway station in the Swiss canton of Zurich. The station location straddles the municipalities of Eglisau and Hüntwangen, but takes its name from Hüntwangen and the adjoining municipality of Wil. In terms of railway geography, the station is on the Eglisau to Neuhausen line of the Swiss Federal Railway (SBB), which crosses the international border twice, travelling through German territory, on its route between the Swiss cantons of Zurich and Schaffhausen.

The station is operated by the SBB and is an intermediate stop on  Zurich S-Bahn line S9 between Zurich and Schaffhausen.

Between Hüntwangen-Wil and the preceding Eglisau station, the railway crosses the Eglisau railway bridge over the Rhine.

References

External links

Hüntwangen-Wil station on Swiss Federal Railway's web site

Huntwangen-Wil
Huntwangen-Wil